Rationalist was a Polish magazine published in Warsaw from October 1930 to December 1935 by the Warsaw Circle of Intellectuals, Polish Association of Free Thought.

Editor and publisher of "rationalist" was Józef Landau. The leading publicists were: Tadeusz Kotarbiński, Henryk Ułaszyn, and Józef Landau.

External links 
 Mariusz Agnosiewicz: Racjonalista 1930-2000: aktualność racjonalizmu
 Czasopismo Racjonalista z roku 1932

1930 establishments in Poland
1935 disestablishments in Poland
Atheism
Defunct magazines published in Poland
Magazines established in 1930
Magazines disestablished in 1935
Magazines published in Warsaw
Visual arts magazines published in Poland
Rationalism
Polish-language magazines
Philosophy magazines